The South Florida Bulls softball team represents University of South Florida in NCAA Division I college softball.  The team participates in the American Athletic Conference. The Bulls are currently led by head coach Ken Eriksen. The team plays its home games at USF Softball Stadium located on the university's main campus in Tampa, Florida.

USF's softball team has won two national championships, both coming before softball was an NCAA sanctioned sport. They won in the American Softball Association in 1983 and 1984. They have also won eight conference championships, seven of which were regular season titles and one of which was in the conference tournament.

History

Pre-NCAA 
Before softball officially became an NCAA sport in 1985, the Bulls (known as the Lady Brahmans until 1987) played in the Association for Intercollegiate Athletics for Women and the American Softball Association. Unfortunately, not many records exist from this era of USF softball, and 1985 is recognized by the school as the first official season of the team as that is the year they joined the NCAA. However, it is known that the team's actual first season of play was in 1973 and that the team went to the AIAW Quarterfinals in 1976 and 1981. After the AIAW disbanded in 1982, the American Softball Association (now USA Softball) took over as the top collegiate governing body for the sport. The Lady Brahmans won the national championship in both years of the ASA before joining the NCAA in 1985, making them the first team in USF history to win a national championship.

Coaching history

Season by season results

Championships

National Championships

Conference Championships

Conference Tournament Championships

Coaching staff

Perfect Games and No Hitters

Perfect Games 
USF pitchers have thrown five perfect games in school history:

 Leigh Ann Ellis, March 11, 2003, vs. Canisus
 Sara Nevins, March 11, 2012, vs. Toledo
 Sara Nevins, May 4, 2014, vs. Temple
 Georgina Corrick, March 6, 2022, vs. Florida A&M
 Georgina Corrick, April 30, 2022 vs. Houston

No Hitters 
Bulls pitchers have also thrown 27 no hitters (not including no hitters that were also perfect games):

 Lori Romero, 1985
 Lori Romero, 1986
 Monica Triner, 1996 vs. Bradley
 Monica Triner, 1996 vs. Penn State
 Jessi Kowal, 2000 vs. St. Louis
 Leigh Ann Ellis, 2003 vs. Ball State
 Danielle Urbanik, 2004 vs. UAB
 Kristen Gordon/Bree Spence, 2007 vs. ETSU
 Cristi Ecks, Capri Catalano & Courtney Mosch, 2009 vs. Hofstra
 Sara Nevins, 2012 vs. Central Connecticut
 Sara Nevins, 2012 vs. Pittsburgh
 Lindsey Richardson, 2013 vs. Maine
 Sara Nevins, 2013 vs. Pittsburgh
 Lindsey Richardson, 2013 vs. Providence
 Lindsey Richardson, 2013 vs. Marshall
 Sara Nevins/Erica Nuun, 2014 vs Illinois State
 Sara Nevins, 2014 vs. UMass
 Sara Nevins, 2014 vs. UConn
 Sara Nevins, 2014 vs. UCF
 Erica Nuun, 2015 vs. Illinois State
 Georgina Corrick, 2018 vs. UNF
 Georgina Corrick/Vivian Ponn, 2020 vs. FIU
 Georgina Corrick, 2021 vs. North Dakota
Georgina Corrick, April 30, 2021 vs. ECU
Georgina Corrick, May 1, 2021 vs. ECU
Georgina Corrick, 2021 vs. Baylor
Georgina Corrick, 2022 vs. ECU

Awards and honors

All-Americans 
First team 
Leslie Kanter, 1986
Dawn Melfi, 1992
Georgina Corrick, 2022

Second team 
Lisa Wunar, 1987
Monica Triner, 1998
Monica Triner, 1999
Holly Groves, 2004
Sara Nevins, 2012
Erica Nuun, 2016
Georgina Corrick, 2019

Third team 
Leigh Ann Ellis, 2004
Tiffany Stewart, 2005
Sara Nevins, 2013
Sara Nevins, 2014
Georgina Corrick, 2021

National awards
NFCA National Pitcher of the Year
Georgina Corrick, 2022

Softball America Pitcher of the Year
Georgina Corrick, 2022

NFCA Golden Shoe Award
Alexis Johns (2022)
NCAA Pitching Triple Crown

 Georgina Corrick, 2022 (first pitching triple crown in NCAA history)

Conference awards
Sources:

Conference USA Pitcher of the Year
Leigh Ann Ellis, 2004

Conference USA Freshman of the Year
Bree Spence, 2005

Big East Pitcher of the Year
Sara Nevins, 2013

Big East Freshman of the Year
Cristi Ecks, 2006
Capri Catalano, 2008

AAC Player of the Year
Juli Weber, 2016

AAC Pitcher of the Year
Sara Nevins, 2014
Erica Nunn, 2016
Georgina Corrick, 2018, 2019, 2021, 2022

AAC Freshman of the Year
Juli Weber, 2014
Georgina Corrick, 2018

AAC Defensive Player of the Year
Macy Cook, 2019

National Team members 
  Monica Triner, 2000
  Leigh Ann Ellis, 2005–06
  Kourtney Salvarola, 2011–13
  Lee Ann Spivey, 2013
  Erica Nuun, 2013
  Sara Nevins, 2013–15
  Astin Donovan, 2015–16
  Lauren Evans, 2017–present
  Georgina Corrick, 2017–present

USF Athletic Hall of Fame 

 Monica Triner, 1996-99 (inducted 2011)
 Sara Nevins, 2011-14 (inducted 2019)

Media 
Under the current American Athletic Conference TV deal, all home and in-conference away softball games are shown on one of the various ESPN networks or streamed live on ESPN+. Live radio broadcasts of games are also available nationwide for free on the Bulls Unlimited digital radio station on TuneIn.

See also

 South Florida Bulls baseball
 University of South Florida
 South Florida Bulls

Notes

References

 
American Athletic Conference softball